is a Japanese actress and singer. She won the award for best supporting actress at the 8th Yokohama Film Festival for His Motorbike, Her Island.

Filmography

See also
Hiroko Yakushimaru
Tomoyo Harada

References

External links

1965 births
Living people
Japanese actresses
People from Ōita Prefecture